is a government system for dispatching young Japanese volunteers overseas operated by Japan International Cooperation Agency (JICA). The program is similar to the U.S. Peace Corps, and includes volunteers in wide range of fields such as agriculture, forestry, fisheries, education, health, and more than 120 technical fields. Since 1965, more than 30,000 Japanese volunteers have been dispatched to more than 80 developing countries in Asia, Middle East, Africa, Central and South America, the Caribbean, and Oceania.
The recruitment is held on April to May and October to November annually. Japanese citizens aged from 20 to 39 are eligible to apply. It is commonly known by the initialism JOCV.

History 
The plan was started in 1957 after Japan joined Colombo Plan in 1954. After the Peace Corps was established by United States in 1961, the JOCV was established in 1965. The first volunteers dispatched to Laos in Southeast Asia.

After while, some related project was started. As of 2000, the total number of JOCV was over 20,000. As of July 2013, the total number of JOCV was 38,300 and the number of countries was 88.

Activities 
The JOCV work with a local organization such as a government office, a town office, a school. The JOCV's term is 2 years. But they can extend 1 year if they need.

Countries 
As of July 2013, the JOCV were working in 71 countries and they used to work in 88 countries. The majority of JOCV work in Asia, Africa, and Latin America, though many work in the Middle East and some parts of Eastern Europe as well.

Technical Fields 
There are more than 120 technical fields in 8 sectors. As of July 2013, the Education, Culture & Sports sector constitute about half of JOCVs who are working. And also, the sector constitute 39% of a cumulative total of JOCVs. The Agriculture, Forestry & Fisheries sector and the Manufacturing & Mechanical Training sector constituted a large share of JOCVs, but now they constitute less than 10%.

Recruitment 
Japanese citizens aged from 20 to 39 are eligible for the application. The number of applicants peaked at 11,832 each year in 1994. However, as of April 2011, the number of applicants reached a nadir at only 1,351 each half-year because Tōhoku earthquake and Arab Spring effected and the government cut benefits last year.

 First screening
The screening run the following areas on paper exam.
 Technological skills
 Language skills
 Health

Second screening
The screening run in Tokyo and some local cities.
 Interview – It include a practical exam if it is required.
 Health – If it is required.

Even if one passes the required technical examination, he or she can sometimes be rejected, because his or her technical backgrounds might be judged not to match for any requests from the countries of any choices. Therefore, there are some cases of being hired after some repeated examinations. There are also some other cases of hiring applicants of low technical capabilities, or rejecting those of high technical capabilities.

In terms of health check, the required medical standard is strict because serious health problems can occur in developing countries to even one who can live a healthy life in Japan. The required medical standard depends on what country they are dispatched to, because the medical levels vary from country to country.

The second screening result has 3 status 'passed', 'rejected', and 'registered'. As previously explained, some of applicants with high technical capability and without matching for requests can be 'registered'. They can be promoted to be 'passed' when some successful applicants turn the requests down to leave a hole, or some countries make more requests out of the recruitment period.

Training 
If applicants passes the second screening, they will start to spend 65 days training as JOCV members in either of 2 training centers: one in Komagane City, Nagano Prefecture and another in Nihonmatsu City, Fukushima Prefecture. Which training center they are assigned to depends on what country they are going to be dispatched to. If they join JOCV after leaving their own offices, the period of unemployment benefit payments can be expanded of the day when they start training.

Basic Trainings
Radio Calisthenics and Hoisting of the National Flags in the Early Morning
Before Lunch: Learning each languages of the countries where they are going to be dispatched to
Afternoon: Lecture of country studies, cross-cultural understandings, health managements, and emergency procedures
(vaccination times  – once a week)

Food costs and lodging expenses are free while training. As charges of courses, 50,000 yen for one month is also supplied. The trainers are allowed to go out of the training centers after evening of Mon-Sat and on Sunday, but staying out overnight is allowed only on Sat-Sun. The volunteers are divided into 4 groups by the timing of dispatch. 1st group members are dispatched on June, 2nd group on September, 3rd group on December, and 4th group on March.

See also
 Japan International Cooperation Agency
 Peace Corps
 Voluntary Service Overseas

References

External links
 JICA official website
 JICA's Overseas Volunteers
 Japan Ministry of Foreign Affairs ODA webpage

International development agencies
International Cooperation Agency
International Cooperation Agency
Volunteer organizations
Japan International Cooperation Agency
1965 establishments in Japan
Government agencies established in 1965